
Charuvi Agrawal is an Indian painter, sculptor, animator, filmmaker, and visual artist. She graduated from Sheridan Institute of Technology and Advanced Learning, Canada, and is a gold medalist in fine arts from the College of Art, University of Delhi.

Charuvi Agrawal is an avant-garde multi-media artist best known for technological enabled large scale physical artworks, animated short films, TV shows and immersive experiences (VR/AR). Her films have been screened at various film festivals while her artwork has been displayed at various public forums besides being in homes of discerning collectors in India. Her work routinely tests the boundaries of interactive technology, design and art employing elements of Indian mythology to present transformational and immersive storytelling. Her "26,000 Bells of light", a travelling exhibition includes a 25 feet interactive bell installation, numerous mythology inspired figurines, paintings, augmented reality installation, and a hand painted Kavad which has been showcased in various Indian metros. In 2016, her people's revolution zoetrope was placed at the Lucknow JP Museum as a permanent artifact besides being commissioned to make more for other public forum.

After graduating with a bachelor's degree in fine arts from the Delhi College of Arts, India in 2005, Charuvi went on to get a masters in computer animation from Sheridan Institute of Technology and Advanced Learning, Canada. She excelled at both institutes, graduating with top honors. She then started her design firm CDL (Charuvi Design Labs) focusing on high quality animation content and artwork. Based out of Gurugram, CDL creates works that are visually opulent, technically ambitious and which reworks the imagery and mythology of the popular Indian narratives. A technique Charuvi often employs is the juxtaposition of small and everyday against the large and imposing.

She has been honored twice at "Limca Books of World Records" and at the age of 23 she was facilitated at "Incredible India @60" festival in New York by Coca-Cola as one of "the emerging 10 who would transform the global artistic landscape." She has contributed to various publications and spoken at multiple platforms including GDG Women Techmakers @Google, Tedx @IIT Kharagpur, Edinburgh University, India Design Forum, Animation Master's Summit, SIGGRAPH.

She founded CDL (Charuvi Design Labs) in 2009, and worked in Canada for National Film Board.

Her biggest achievement is the 3D Animation film Shri Hanuman Chalisa, made in 2013 and which received many awards. She is a well-known personality in the field of animation and fine arts.

Early life and background

Agrawal was born in 1983 in New Delhi. She trained in fine art at the College of Art in Delhi where she won a gold medal, and followed it up with a graduation in computer animation from Sheridan Institute of Technology and Advanced Learning in Canada. A multi talented artist she paints, sculpts, designs, works in animation and films.

Her most notable work is her animated short film Shri Hanuman Chalisa and she made a 25-foot Bell Sculptor of Lord Hanuman of 26,000 bells.

Charuvi Design Labs (CDL)

Charuvi Design Labs (CDL) is a leading animation studio and design lab founded by Charuvi Agrawal in 2009. CDL is an independently owned and operated studio of national and international repute, specialize in 2D and 3D Animation, VFX, Design and Interactive Art Installations.

CDL studio has partnered with numerous global brands and international agencies and has showcased its talent at countless exhibitions and festivals in India, as well as around the globe.

The Legend of Hanuman - Animated Web Series

An Animated Series "The Legend of Hanuman" produced by Graphic India and created by Sharad Devarajan, Charuvi Agrawal and Jeevan J. Kang. The series is a combined effort of artists from Graphic India, Charuvi Agrawal (CDL) and Redefine. The series was released on Disney+ Hotstar globally on January 29, 2021 in seven Indian languages. The animated web series features Lord Hanuman's extraordinary journey of self-discovery. It is Narrated by Sharad Kelkar.

The series follows Hanuman and his transformation from a mighty warrior to a god and how Hanuman became the beacon of hope amidst the harrowing darkness.

All 26 episodes of the show are available in 7 languages – Hindi, Tamil, Telugu, Marathi, Bengali, Malayalam, and Kannada; and were exclusively released on Disney+ Hotstar VIP. In 2021, Graphic India announced that "The Legend of Hanuman" was the #2 most-watched show in 2021 across all Indian streaming platforms. Source APN News.

Claytronics

Charuvi Agrawal developed a new technique which she called "Claytronics". She uses clay to create humorous miniature 3-D sculptures, each telling a topical story.

She has chosen to deliberate on something that was a childhood hobby—creating interesting figures out of clay.

She learnt clay making at a summer camp that happened at her school, when she was in class VI. She not at all thought she would excel to this extent later in her life.

For example, The miniature of former PM Dr. Manmohan Singh, depicts him as puppet and the one of APJ Abdul Kalam depicts him on rocket with a comb in his pocket! Basically, she combines the art of cartooning with that of sculpture.

She created many miniatures like Arnold Schwarzenegger, Mother Teresa, Veerapan, Osama Bin Laden, Dr. Manmohan Singh, APJ Abdul Kalam, Sonia Gandhi, Atal Bihari Vajpayee, Lalu Prasad Yadav, Mulayam Singh, Dr Salim Ali, George Bush, Bal Thackeray and I.K Gujral.

Shri Hanuman Chalisa

Shri Hanuman Chalisa directed by Charuvi Agrawal in 2013. 3D animated short film “Shri Hanuman Chalisa”is a symbolic visual poetry of an ancient religious composition that has been sung and hymn across the globe.

The soundtrack is sung by Shaan.

The film has been bestowed critical praise across the globe and nominated in 6 Oscar qualifying films.

The film tries to push the limits of our understanding of faith and spirituality.

Shri Hanuman Chalisa is a film filled with impressive and visually eye-catching scenes of Hindu mythology God - Shri Hanuman. Our perceptive of the divine has a variety of expressions but its factual nature lies within the realization of one‐self. Shri Hanuman provides the highest expression of devotional values and is the purest embodiment seeking God.

Shri Hanuman Suspended Sculpture 
A Shri Hanuman 25 ft Suspended Sculpture made of 26000 Bells is created by Charuvi Agrawal. The 25 feet sculpture of Shri Hanuman made of 26,000 bells which is a unique combination of art and technology and also a humble effort in portray the depth, splendor and the meaning of the verses.

Thali Bajao Praxinoscope – The Peoples Revolution 
Charuvi Agrawal presents A Tour De Force for The Jayprakash Narayan Museum in Lucknow, where a praxinoscope titled Thali Bajao, attempts to recreate the flash in history.

The seven-foot-tall revolving sculpture was made using clay, fibre glass, metal, plaster, and acrylic in a makeshift workshop over 11 weeks. Kept on a rotating platform and with perfectly calibrated strobe lights, the sculpture is designed to take the viewer into the true essence of what it is.

References

External links
 Official Website
 Charuvi Design Lab's Official Website

1983 births
Living people
Indian experimental filmmakers
Indian women designers
21st-century Indian designers
Indian animators
Indian animated film directors
Indian women film directors
Indian women animators
Indian women painters
Women artists from Delhi
21st-century Indian women artists
Women experimental filmmakers